Mattisson is a Swedish surname. Notable people with the surname include:

Hasse Mattisson (born 1972), Swedish footballer and coach
René Mattisson
Thilde Mattisson
Tess Mattisson (born 1978), Swedish singer

See also
Mattison
Christine Matison

Swedish-language surnames